The Pomeranian Voivodeship Sejmik is the regional legislature of the voivodeship of Pomerania, Poland. It is a unicameral parliamentary body consisting of thirty-three councillors chosen during regional elections for a five-year term. The current chairperson of the assembly is Jan Kleinszmidt of the KO.

The assembly elects the executive board that acts as the collective executive for the provincial government, headed by the voivodeship marshal. The current Executive Board of Pomerania is a coalition government between Civic Coalition and the Polish People's Party under the leadership of Marshal Mieczysław Struk of the KO.

The assembly convenes within the Marshal's Office in Gdańsk.

Districts 

Members of the Assembly are elected from five districts, serve five-year terms. Districts does not have the constituencies formal names. Instead, each constituency has a number and territorial description.

See also 
 Polish Regional Assembly
 Pomeranian Voivodeship

References

External links 
 Official website
 Executive board official website

Pomeranian
Assembly
Unicameral legislatures